The Apostle is a spy thriller novel written by New York Times Bestselling author Brad Thor. The Apostle is the eighth book in the Scot Harvath series.

Plot 
The Apostle follows the character of Scot Harvath as he is sent on a top secret assignment for the United States government to rescue Julia Gallo, a kidnapped American doctor. For her to be released, the ransom is the freeing of al-Qaeda member Mustafa Khan from Policharki Prison. Once there, Harvath discovers that this was not a simple kidnapping and that nothing is as it seems.

Reception
Critical reception for The Apostle has been mixed to positive, with Publishers Weekly calling the book "less than convincing". Booklist wrote that one of the subplots "seems to be from a completely different book distracts a bit, but the main story line will keep fans of action-driven thrillers reading." BookReporter.com praised The Apostle, citing that "Thor continues to top himself with each successive novel and
reaches new and even more exciting heights with THE APOSTLE."

References 

American spy novels
2009 American novels